Cowgate is an area of Edinburgh.

Cowgate may also refer to:

Cowgate, Newcastle upon Tyne
Cowgate, Cumbria